Reece Chapman-Smith is a professional rugby league footballer who plays as a  for Hunslet in the Betfred League 1.

Early life
Chapman-Smith was born in Leeds, West Yorkshire, England, but studied at Silcoates School in Wakefield 

He started out playing rugby union for Sandal RUFC before switching to play rugby league at Oulton Raiders in Leeds where he was scouted by Leeds Rhinos in 2013.

Career
After being scouted by Leeds in 2013, Chapman Smith played in the academy. Although he was hampered by injuries, he had a regular place in the team starting out at fullback or on the wing before going on to play stand-off for most of the 2018 season.

In November 2018 it was announced Smith would spend the 2019 season with Halifax in the Championship to further his development.

Genealogical information
Reece Chapman-Smith is the son of the rugby league footballer; Chris Chapman.

References

1998 births
Living people
Dewsbury Rams players
English rugby league players
Halifax R.L.F.C. players
Hunslet R.L.F.C. players
Leeds Rhinos players
Rugby league players from Leeds